Pascal Cerrone (born 12 June 1981) is a Swiss former professional footballer who played as a football defender in the Swiss Super League for FC Vaduz. He later played for FC Wil.

References

1981 births
Living people
Swiss men's footballers
Switzerland under-21 international footballers
Association football defenders
Swiss Super League players
Swiss Challenge League players
FC Winterthur players
FC Thun players
FC St. Gallen players
FC Wil players
FC Vaduz players
Swiss expatriate footballers
Swiss expatriate sportspeople in Liechtenstein
Expatriate footballers in Liechtenstein
FC Frauenfeld players
Swiss people of Italian descent
Swiss expatriates in Liechtenstein
FC Frauenfeld managers
Swiss football managers
Footballers from Geneva